The Titi Caravanserai (Persian and Gilaki: تی تی کاروانسرا) Is a Caravanserai in Siahkal County, Iran. Dating back to Safavid era, it was enlisted in the Iran national heritage sites list with the registration number 1784 in 2 December 1996.

Description 
Built by an aunt of a Safavid ruler named Titi Khanum, it was constructed using bricks, gypsum, and stones.

References 

Tourist attractions in Gilan Province
Caravanserais in Iran